Paraceryx is a genus of moths in the subfamily Arctiinae. It contains the single species Paraceryx aroa, which is found in New Guinea.

References

Natural History Museum Lepidoptera generic names catalog

Arctiinae